Shafiga Akhundova (21 January 1924 – 26 July 2013) was a prominent Azerbaijani composer, the first professional female author of an opera in the East and People’s Artist of Azerbaijan.

Akhundova was born into a family of an eminent cultural figure Gulam Akhundov in Shaki in 1924. Gulam Bagir oglu Akhundov, who was a public servant and intellectual of his time, worked as the first secretary of Shaki between 1917 and 1920, while her mother was a housewife.

In 1943–1944, Shafiga got her primary education at Baku Musical School named after Asaf Zeynally, where she was taught by Uzeyir Hajibeyov. Then, in 1956, she continued her education at Azerbaijan State Conservatoire named after Uzeyir Hajibeyov, where she graduated from the class of B. Zeydman. In 1998, Shafiga Akhundova has conferred a title of People’s Artist of Azerbaijan and in 2004 she was awarded the Shohrat Order.

Creativity
In 1972, Shafiga Akhundova composed her first opera “Galin gayasi” (Bride’s rock). She also has composed such works as “Ev bizim, sirr bizim”  operetta (1965), 600 songs such as "Leyla","Bəxtiyar ellər","Victory Anthem", "Victory is ours","Motherland" and romantic pieces "What's Beautiful", "Jahanda by Nizami Ganjavi",  music for spectacles for children ("Təlxəyin nağılı", "Dovşanın ad günü") etc. She composed music for more than 30 spectacles, staged in state theatres, dramatic theatres ("Aydın","Əlvida Hindistan!","Nə üçün yaşayırsan?").

Awards
Order of the Badge of Honour- June 9, 1959
Honoured Art Worker of the Azerbaijan SSR- November 26, 1973
People's Artist of Azerbaijan- May 24, 1998
Personal Scholarship of the President of the Republic of Azerbaijan*- June 11, 2002
Shohrat Order- January 11, 2002

Filmography
1."Azərbaycan elləri" (1976)

2."Mənim atam Əliövsət Sadıqov" (2007)

3."Bəstəkar Şəfiqə Axundova" (2012)

References

Azerbaijani women composers
Soviet composers
Azerbaijani opera composers
Soviet opera composers
Baku Academy of Music alumni
People's Artists of Azerbaijan
1924 births
Women classical composers
People from Shaki, Azerbaijan
2013 deaths
Recipients of the Shohrat Order
Soviet Azerbaijani people
Women opera composers
Honored Art Workers of the Azerbaijan SSR